Moringua bicolor, the bicolor spaghetti eel, is an eel in the family Moringuidae (spaghetti/worm eels). It was described by Johann Jakob Kaup in 1856. It is a marine eel known from Japan, Indonesia, the Philippines, and the Laccadive Sea, in the Indo-West Pacific.

Moringua bicolor is the first moringuid eel to be described from Japan.

References

Moringuidae
Taxa named by Johann Jakob Kaup
Fish described in 1856